A list of films produced in Europe by country of origin:

Albania

Andorra

No pronunciarás el nombre de Dios en vano (1999)
La Perversa caricia de Satán (1975)

Armenia

Austria

Azerbaijan

All for the Best (1997)
Alma (1992)
Arshin mal-alan (1917)
Istinnye proishestviya (2002)
Listopad v poru leta (1986)
Melody of Space (2004)
Natsionalnaya bomba (2004)
Ovsunchu (2003)
Sari gyalin (1999)
V tzarstve nefti i millionov (1916)
Wishing for Two Sons and One Daughter (2002)
Yarasa (1994)
Yuk (1995)

Belarus

Belgium

Bosnia and Herzegovina

Bulgaria

Croatia

Cyprus

Czech Republic

Denmark

Estonia

Faroe Islands

Finland

France

Georgia

Germany

Greece

Greenland

Hungary

Iceland

Ireland

Italy

Latvia

Liechtenstein
99 Women (1969)
Austerlitz (1960)
The Bloody Judge (1970)
The Castle of Fu Manchu (1969)
Les Cauchemars naissent la nuit (1970)
Count Dracula (1970)
Dog Eat Dog (1964)
Eugenie… The Story of Her Journey into Perversion (1970)
Eve (1968)
Five Golden Dragons (1967)
Geliebte Hochstaplerin (1961)
 (1959)
Goal! The World Cup (1966)
Happening in Weiß (1969)
Hell River (1974)
Die Kinder des Geldes (2003)
The Light at the Edge of the World (1971)
Little Buddha (1993)
La Loba y la paloma (1974)
Maja Plisetskaja (1982)
Paris, je t'aime (2006)
 (1966)
Seven Vengeful Women (1966)
Sex Charade (1970)
Sins of Rome (1953)
The Sky Is Falling (1979)
Vienna Waltzes (1951)
A Virgin Among the Living Dead (1973)
 (1958)

Lithuania

Luxembourg

Malta

Moldova
Angel Geminii (1997) (TV)
Chuchelo (1992)
Danila Prepeleac (1996)
Dezertir (1997)
Dolina schastya (1993)
Moldawien – Ein vergessenes Land (2003) (TV)
Patul lui Procust (2001)
Rikoshet (1997)
Sweet Dreams (2000)
Vinovata li ya... (1992)
Vodovorot (1992)
What a Wonderful World (Ce Lume Minunată, 2014)

Monaco
Alleluja e Sartana figli di... Dio (1972)
Blood and Black Lace (1964)
D77 (2005, short)
Fantasma d'amore (1981)
The Grand Duel (1972)
Kidnapped to Mystery Island (1964)
The Last Days of Pompeii (1959)
Mr. Superinvisible(1970)
NY, the Lost Civilization (1996, documentary)
Pavarotti canta Verdi (2002, documentary)
Sandokan Against the Leopard of Sarawak (1964)
Vacanze a Ischia (1957)
The Wedding in Monaco (1956, documentary)

Montenegro

Netherlands

North Macedonia

Bal-Can-Can (2005)
Before the Rain (1994)
Dust (2001)
Frosina (1952)
Goodbye, 20th Century! (1998)
Gypsy Magic (1997)
Macedonian Blood Wedding (1967)
Mirage (2004)
Miss Stone (1958)
Shadows (2007)
The Great Water (2004)
The Secret Book (2006)
The Solun Assassins (1963)
The Third Half (2012)

Norway

Poland

Portugal

Romania

Russia

Serbia

Slovakia

Slovenia

Spain

Sweden

Switzerland

Turkey

Ukraine

United Kingdom

Yugoslavia

See also
 European cinema
 World cinema
 Cinema Europe: The Other Hollywood

External links
 European film at the Internet Movie Database
 European Film Database provided by European Film Promotion

Europe

Films